Edmond Martin Cash (born August 6, 1971) is a producer, songwriter, engineer, and multi-instrumentalist. He was named the "Producer of the Year" at the Gospel Music Awards for four consecutive years (2004–2007) and gains recognition for his work with Christian singer Chris Tomlin. In addition to several Grammy Nominations and countless BMI Citations of Achievement, Cash has produced or written with artists such as Steven Curtis Chapman, Vince Gill, Dolly Parton, Colin Bernard, Amy Grant, Keith & Kristyn Getty, Bebo Norman, David Crowder Band, Bethany Dillon, Kari Jobe, Dave Barnes, Matt Wertz, Caedmon's Call, Casting Crowns, Annette Lee. Since 2018, he has been a member of the band We the Kingdom.

Background 

Cash gained further recognition as a songwriter for having co-written and produced "How Great Is Our God", which earned him five Dove awards, including Song of the Year and Praise and Worship Song of the Year. Along with having co-written with Chris Tomlin, Mark Hall (Casting Crowns) and Amy Grant, Ed Cash has also received honors from the BMI Awards as the Christian Songwriter of the Year and Song of the Year.

Cash is a recognized musician with credit for acoustic and electric guitar and backing vocals, album credits for playing banjo, mandolin, Hammond B3 organ, Wurlitzer organ, harmonica, Rhodes, programming, synthesizer, piano, drums, bass guitar, percussion, and both string and choir arrangements.

Cash severed ties with The Gathering International when it came under scrutiny in  Christianity Today investigating the group's finances. The article claimed that Cash's songwriting had helped fund the group.

Awards 

 "How Great Is Our God"
 GMA Dove Award's Producer of the Year 2005
 GMA Dove Award's Album of the Year 2005
 Arriving
 GMA Dove Award's Producer of the Year 2006
 GMA Dove Award's Praise and Worship Album of the Year 2006
 Arriving
 GMA Dove Award's Song of the Year 2006
 "How Great Is Our God"
 GMA Dove Award's Worship Song of the Year 2006
 "How Great Is Our God"
 GMA Dove Award's Special Event Album of the Year 2006
 Music inspired by The Chronicles of Narnia: The Lion, the Witch, and the Wardrobe
 Worship Leader Praise Awards of 2006
 "Made to Worship"
 BMI Most Performed Christian Song of the Year 2007
 "Made to Worship"
 GMA Dove Award's Producer of the Year 2007
 GMA Dove Award's Album of the Year 2007
 See the Morning
 GMA Dove Award's Praise & Worship Album of the Year 2007
 See the Morning
 GMA Dove Award's Song of the Year 2007
 "How Great Is Our God"
 GMA Dove Award's Worship Song of the Year 2008
 "How Great Is Our God"
 BMI Christian Songwriter of the Year 2008
 BMI Christian Song of the Year 2008
 "Made to Worship"
 GMA Dove Award's Inspiration Album of the Year 2009
 Great God Who Saves
 GMA Dove Award's Contemporary Gospel Recorded Song of the Year 2009
 "How Great Is Our God"
 BMI Award of the Year 2010
 GMA Dove Award's Spanish Language Album of the Year 2010
 Le Canto - Kari Jobe
 Several Grammy Nominations and Countless Citations of Achievement from BMI
 GMA Dove Award's Producer of the Year 2012
 GMA Dove Award's Producer of the Year 2013
 GMA Dove Award's Producer of the Year 2014

Credits 
Chris August, No Far Away, 2010 – Producer, Engineer, Songwriter, Multi-instrumentalist
Dave Barnes, Razor and Tie – EP, - Producer, engineer
Dave Barnes, Brother Bring the Sun, 2004 – Producer
Dave Barnes, Chasing Mississippi, 2006 – Producer
Dave Barnes, Me and You and the World, 2008 – Producer
Dave Barnes, What We Want, What We Get, 2010 - Producer
Vicky Beeching, Painting the Invisible, 2007- Producer
Caedmon's Call, Long Line of Leavers, 2000 – Producer, Engineer, Multi-instrumentalist
Caedmon's Call, Chronicles 1992-2004, 2004 – Producer
Caedmon's Call, In the Company of Angels, 2001 – Producer, Arranger, Multi-instrumentalist
Steven Curtis Chapman, All I Really Want for Christmas,  2005 – Producer, Engineer, Vocals, Multi-instrumentalist
Steven Curtis Chapman, Musical Blessings, 2006 – Producer, Engineer, Mixing, Multi-instrumentalist
Steven Curtis Chapman, This Moment, 2007 – Producer, Engineer, Mixing
Church at Charlotte, I Want a Faith – "Be Unafraid", 2010 – Co-writer
Paul Colman, Let it Go, 2005 – Producer, Engineer, Mixing, Multi-instrumentalist
Casting Crowns, Until the Whole World Hears, 2009 – Co-writer
David Crowder Band, A Collision, 2005 – Vocal, Producer
David Crowder Band – "How He Loves"- 2009 - Producer, Mixing
Bethany Dillon, Bethany Dillon, 2004 - Producer
Bethany Dillon, Imagination, 2005 – Producer, Engineer, Mixing
Bethany Dillon, Waking Up, 2007 – Producer
Bethany Dillon, So Far: The Acoustic Sessions, 2007 - Producer
Daniel Doss Band, Greater Than Us All, 2008 – Producer, Engineer, Mixing, Multi-instrumentalist
Amy Grant, Greatest Hits 1986-2004 – Producer, Engineer, Mixing, Multi-instrumentalist
Sara Groves, Add to the Beauty, 2005 – Songwriter
Israel Houghton, The Power of One, "My Tribute Melody" – Co-writer
Jesus Culture, Everything, 2010 - Songwriter
Kari Jobe, Kari Jobe, 2009 – Producer, Engineer, Multi-instrumentalist
Jorma Kaukonen (of Jefferson Airplane), Stars in My Crown, 2007 – Production
Wes King, What Matters the Most, 2001 – Producer, Engineer, Multi-instrumentalist
Leeland, Love is on the Move, 2009 – Producer, Engineer, Mixing
Luminate, Luminate, 2010  - Producer, Engineer, Songwriter, Lyricist
Matt Maher, Empty and Beautiful, 2008 – Producer, Engineer, Mixing, Multi-instrumentalist
Kathy Mattea, Roses, 2002 – Producer
Mercy River, Beautiful Dawn, 2010 – Songwriter
Monk & Neagle, Monk & Neagle, 2004 – Producer, Engineer, Mixing, Multi-instrumentalist
Britt Nicole, Acoustic, 2010 – Producer, Engineer, Mixing, musician
Nichole Nordeman, The Ultimate Collection, 2009 - Producer
Eric Nordhoff, Quietime: Worship, 2010 – Songwriter
Bebo Norman, Big Blue Sky, 2001 – Producer
Bebo Norman, Ten Thousand Days, 1999 – Producer
Bebo Norman, Myself When I am Real, 2002 – Producer, Engineer, Mixing
Bebo Norman, Fabric of Verse, 1999 – Producer, Engineer, Mixing
Bebo Norman, Great Light of the World: The Best of Bebo Norman, 2007 – Producer
Erin O'Donnell, Christmas Time is Here, 2004 – Producer, Engineer, Multi-instrumentalist
Ginny Owens, If you Want Me To, - Producer
Pierced, Worth, 2004 – Producer, Engineer, Multi-instrumentalist
Pocket Full of Rocks, More than a Noise, 2010 – Producer, Engineer, Songwriter
Praise-Apella, Heart God, 2010 - Songwriter
Sarah Reeves, Sweet Sweet Sound, 2009 – Producer, Engineer, Mixing, Multi-instrumentalist
Starfield, Beauty in the Broken, 2006 - Producer
Starfield, I will Go, 2008 – Producer, Engineer, Mixing, Guitar
Starfield, Saving One, 2010 – Producer
Laura Story, There is Nothing (Gate Records), - Producer, Engineer
TobyMac, Tonight, 2010 – Songwriter
Chris Tomlin, Arriving, 2004 – Producer
Chris Tomlin, Live From Austin Hall, 2005 – Producer, Multi-instrumentalist
Chris Tomlin, See the Morning, 2006 – Producer, Multi-instrumentalist
Chris Tomlin, Hello Love, 2008 – Producer
Chris Tomlin, Glory in the Highest: Christmas Songs of Worship, 2009 – Producer, Songwriter
Chris Tomlin, Love Ran Red, 2014 - Producer, Engineer, Mixing, Multi-instrumentalist
Tommy Walker, I Have a Hope, 2008 – Producer
The War, Waving White, 2007 – Producer
Watermark, A Grateful People, 2005 – Guest Appearance
Matt Wertz, TwentyThree Places, 2003 – Producer
Matt Wertz, Today & Tomorrow [EP], 2005 – Producer, Engineer, Mixing, Multi-instrumentalist
Matt Wertz, Everything in Between, 2006 – Producer
Matt Wertz, Under the Summer Sun, 2008 - Producer
Matthew West, Something to Say, 2007 – Producer, Engineer, Multi-instrumentalist
Moriah Peters, I Choose Jesus, 2012 – Producer
 Various artists, I'll Fly Away: Country Hymns & Songs of Faith – Producer, Engineer, Mixing, author, Multi-instrumentalist
Vince Gill – Producer, Multi-instrumentalist, Engineer
Dolly Parton – Producer, Multi-instrumentalist, Engineer
Annette Lee, All Our Achilles Heels, 2017 - Executive Producer

Movies/DVD/TV 
Billy: The Early Years of Billy Graham, 2008 - Producer
Dreamer [Original Motion Picture Soundtrack], John Debney, 2005 – Producer, Mixing, Recording
Music Inspired by the Original Motion Picture Amazing Grace, Various Artists, 2007  - Producer, Guitar
Fruitcake and Ice Cream, Louie Giglio, [DVD] 2008 - Producer
Indescribable, Louie Giglio, [DVD] 2008 - Producer

References

External links 
 

American rock musicians
American record producers
1971 births
Living people
American gospel musicians
Charlotte Country Day School alumni